Colostethus alacris is a species of frog in the family Dendrobatidae. It is endemic to Colombia. Its natural habitats are subtropical or tropical moist montane forests and rivers.

References

Colostethus
Amphibians of Colombia
Taxa named by Juan A. Rivero
Amphibians described in 1990
Taxonomy articles created by Polbot